The Women's World Golf Rankings, also known for sponsorship reasons as the Rolex Rankings, were introduced in February 2006. They are sanctioned by eight women's golf tours and the organisations behind them: Ladies Professional Golf Association (LPGA Tour), Ladies European Tour, Ladies Professional Golfers' Association of Japan (LPGA of Japan Tour), Korea Ladies Professional Golf Association (LPGA of Korea Tour), Australian Ladies Professional Golf (ALPG Tour), Epson Tour, China Ladies Professional Golf Association Tour, the Ladies European Tour Access Series and also by The R&A, which administers the Women's British Open and the United States Golf Association which conducts the U.S. Women's Open.

The idea of introducing a set of women's rankings similar to the Official World Golf Ranking was developed at the May 2004 World Congress of Women's Golf, and was first planned for 2005, but then put back to 2006.

Calculation of the rankings
The rankings are based on performances on the eight major tours (LPGA, JLPGA, KLPGA, LET, ALPG, Epson Tour, LETAS, CLPGA) over a two-year period. Amateur players are eligible. The system for calculating the rankings is similar to that for the men's Official World Golf Ranking. Players receive points for each good finish on the relevant tours, with the number of points available in each event depending on the strength of the field, as determined by the competitors' existing rankings (when the rankings were introduced rankings were calculated for earlier periods; the first ever set showed notional changes since the previous week). The only exceptions are the five LPGA majors and all Epson Tour, CLPGA and LETAS events which have a fixed-point allocation, presently 100 points for the majors. Rankings are weighted as to the time elapsed over the two years, making the recent results more important.

Original formula
When the rankings were first introduced in February 2006, a player's ranking as calculated in the above description was divided by the number of events played, with a minimum required events of 15 over the previous two years. In addition, players were required to play in a minimum of 15 eligible events over the previous two-year period to be included in the rankings.

Formula revisions
On August 2, 2006, the Rolex Rankings Board and Technical Committee announced following its bi-annual meeting two changes to the ranking formula. 
The elimination of the minimum event requirement. Players would no longer be required to participate in 15 qualifying events to be included in the rankings and could be included after playing in as few as one qualifying event. This change would also have the effect of permitting amateurs who had played well in one event to be ranked (e.g., Morgan Pressel, who finished second in the 2005 U.S. Women's Open, or Michelle Wie from age 13).
 The introduction of a minimum divisor. Where previously a player's point total was divided by the number of events she played over the previous 104 weeks, now the player's point total would be divided by the greater of (i) the number of events played or (ii) 35. Thus, players with 35 or more events over the previous 104 weeks would continue to use the actual number of events played as the divisor, but players with fewer than 35 events would use 35 as the divisor.

Many commentators saw the latter change as directed at Michelle Wie, who at the time was ranked second in the world despite having competed in only 16 women's professional events in the two-year period. However, the chairman of the Rolex Rankings Technical Committee defended the change as one designed to make the women's rankings more comparable to the Official World Golf Ranking for men, which use a minimum divisor of 40 events.

On April 16, 2007, another modification in the formula was introduced. Instead of points being awarded on an accumulated 104-week rolling period, with the points awarded in the most recent 13-week period carrying a higher value, points began to be reduced in 91 equal decrements following week 13 for the remaining 91 weeks of the two-year Rolex Ranking period rather than the seven equal 13-week decrements previously used. This modification did not have an immediate impact on the rankings.

2019 event table
The events with the highest "Event rating" in 2019 are shown in the following table.

Criticisms
When they were introduced the rankings attracted considerable criticism on two grounds. First, it was widely felt that members of the LPGA of Japan Tour were ranked too high, since few of them had competed successfully outside Japan. Second, the minimum of 15 events needed to qualify for a ranking was widely seen as having been selected purely to enable Michelle Wie to be highly ranked because she had played exactly that number in the preceding two years, while every other highly ranked player had played many more events. If the women's rankings used the same system used for the men's rankings – that is a minimum number of events of one but a minimum denominator of 40 to calculate the average points per tournament – Wie would have been just outside the top 10. But under the women's ranking system where only players who had played a minimum number of events were included, if the minimum number of events had been set higher than 15, Wie would not have been ranked at all.

The August 2006 revised formula addressed the second criticism. The technical committee that administers the rankings urged patience with regard to the first criticism, since the continuing "strength of the field" weighting of tournaments may correct the issue without any technical changes being made.

Significance of the rankings
The rankings are used by each of the sponsoring tours to determine eligibility criteria for certain events. For example, 40 of the 144 places in the Women's British Open are currently awarded on the basis of the rankings—10 to LET members and 30 to LPGA members. Four of the 12 places in the European Solheim Cup team are allocated on the basis of the rankings.

Since 2013, the rankings at the end of each LPGA Tour season in odd-numbered years have determined the eight countries that will compete in the following year's International Crown, a LPGA-sponsored team event scheduled in even-numbered years and first held in 2014. More specifically, the countries whose top four players have the highest cumulative rankings are invited to compete. The individual participants from each qualified country are determined by the rankings immediately prior to the ANA Inspiration (known before 2015 as the Kraft Nabisco Championship) in the year of the event.

Current top ten
As of 13 March 2023

Change column indicates change in rank from previous week.
Notes

World number ones

Total weeks at No. 1

Year end No. 1

Weeks at No. 1 by country

Players who have reached No. 1 without having won a major title

Year-end world top 10 players

★ indicates player's highest year-end ranking

Historical rankings
Annika Sörenstam of Sweden topped the first set of rankings, which was released on Tuesday 21 February 2006. Paula Creamer (United States); Michelle Wie (United States); Yuri Fudoh (Japan); and Cristie Kerr (United States) took the other places in the top 5. The top one hundred players in the initial rankings came from the following countries:
25: South Korea
23: Japan
21: United States
6: Australia, Sweden
5: United Kingdom (England 3; Scotland 2)
4: Taiwan
2: France
1: Canada, Chile, Colombia, Denmark, Italy, Mexico, Norway, Philippines

Breakdown by nationality
A breakdown of the year-end top-100 by nationality.

See also
Official World Golf Ranking – for male professional golfers
List of World Number One male golfers
World Amateur Golf Ranking – for male and female amateur golfers

References

External links
Official site with full list of all ranked players
Official site with historical rankings of all players

Golf terminology
Women's golf
Golf
Golf rankings
2006 introductions
Rolex sponsorships